Joan Moss (born 1931) is an American  photographer. Moss was born in Toronto, Canada.

Moss began her career in photography in 1973, without any photographic training, by building a darkroom in her home. After a year of shooting with standard film, Moss began using infrared film to create the visual look she would become known for.

Her work is included in the collections of the National Gallery of Canada, the Museum of Contemporary Photography the Museum of Contemporary Art Chicago and the Museum of Fine Arts Houston.

References

21st-century American women artists
21st-century American photographers
20th-century American women artists
20th-century American photographers
1931 births
Living people